The 2015–16 Ural season was the club's 3rd successive season that the club played in the Russian Premier League, the highest tier of association football in Russia, during which they finished the season in 8th. Ural also participated in the Russian Cup, where they were knocked out at the Round of 16 stage by CSKA Moscow.

Squad

Out on loan

Youth team
As per Russian Football Premier League.

Transfers

Summer

In:

Out:

Winter

In:

Out:

Competitions

Russian Premier League

Results by round

Matches

League table

Russian Cup

Squad statistics

Appearances and goals

|-
|colspan="14"|Players away from the club on loan:
|-
|colspan="14"|Players who appeared for Ural Sverdlovsk Oblast no longer at the club:

|}

Goal Scorers

Disciplinary Record

References

FC Ural Yekaterinburg seasons
Ural